The Hidden Eye is a 1945 American mystery film directed by Richard Whorf and written by George Harmon Coxe and Harry Ruskin. It is the sequel to the 1942 film Eyes in the Night. The film stars Edward Arnold, Frances Rafferty, Ray Collins, Paul Langton, William 'Bill' Phillips and Thomas E. Jackson. The film was released on August 31, 1945, by Metro-Goldwyn-Mayer.

Plot
A blind detective, Duncan Maclain, with a seeing-eye dog is asked to help by Jean Hampton after a number of mysterious murders are committed, including ones of her wealthy father and uncle. Jean's fiancé, Barry Gifford, falls under suspicion at first, but Maclain and bodyguard Marty Corbett ultimately conclude that a family lawyer, Treadway, is masterminding a murder and moneymaking scheme. Gifford is about to be framed for the killings when Maclain solves it, after which the detective is asked to be best man at Jean's wedding.

Cast 
Edward Arnold as Capt. Duncan Maclain
Frances Rafferty as Jean Hampton
Ray Collins as Phillip Treadway
Paul Langton as Barry Gifford
William 'Bill' Phillips as Marty Corbett
Thomas E. Jackson as Insp. Delaney
Morris Ankrum as Ferris
Robert Lewis as Stormvig
Francis Pierlot as Kossovsky
Sondra Rodgers as Helen Roberts
Theodore Newton as Gibbs 
Jack Lambert as Louie
Raymond Largay as Arthur Hampton 
Leigh Whipper as Alistair
Byron Foulger as Burton Lorrison
Lee Phelps as Polasky
Eddie Acuff as Whitey
Audrey Totter as Perfume Saleslady (uncredited)
Bob Pepper as Sgt. Kramer
Clyde Fillmore as Rodney Hampton
Friday as himself

References

External links 
 

1945 films
American mystery films
1945 mystery films
Metro-Goldwyn-Mayer films
Films directed by Richard Whorf
American sequel films
American black-and-white films
1940s English-language films
1940s American films